The Mississippi Blues Trail was created by the Mississippi Blues Commission in 2006 to place interpretive markers at the most notable historical sites related to the birth, growth, and influence of the blues throughout (and in some cases beyond) the state of Mississippi. Within the state the trail extends from the Gulf Coast north along several highways to (among other points) Natchez, Vicksburg, Jackson, Leland, Greenwood, Clarksdale, Tunica, Grenada, Oxford, Columbus, and Meridian. The largest concentration of markers is in the Mississippi Delta, but other regions of the state are also commemorated. Several out-of-state markers have also been erected where blues with Mississippi roots has had significance, such as Chicago.

Implementation
The list of markers and locations was developed by a panel of blues scholars and historians. The trail has been implemented in stages as funds have become available. The National Endowment for the Arts, National Endowment for the Humanities, and Mississippi Department of Transportation have provided grants for funding of various markers, which are co-sponsored with funds from local communities.  The marker texts are researched and written by Jim O'Neal and Scott Barretta, former editors of Living Blues magazine, together with an editorial and design team that has included Wanda Clark; Chrissy Wilson; Allan Hammons; and Sylvester Oliver.

Prior to the founding of the Mississippi Blues Trail, two preliminary markers were placed in Indianola, Mississippi, at a corner where B.B. King played as a young man, and at the Club Ebony.

The first three Mississippi Blues Trail markers were dedicated on December 11, 2006. The first, at Holly Ridge, is dedicated to Delta blues pioneer Charley Patton.

The second marker is located by the Southern Whispers Restaurant on Nelson Street in Greenville. Nelson Street, the home of many nightclubs, cafes, and juke joints over the years, was once the primary center of African-American business, entertainment, and social life in the Delta. For many decades this historic strip drew crowds to the flourishing club scene to hear Delta blues; big band; jump blues; rhythm & blues; and jazz.

The third marker was unveiled at the original location of WGRM radio station in Greenwood, where B.B. King first broadcast as a gospel singer.

By the end of 2016, the Mississippi Blues Trail had placed nearly 200 markers. They honored individual artists, clubs, record companies, radio stations, and historic events, but also the plantations, streets, cities, and counties that developed as centers of blues activity. Mississippi State Penitentiary at Parchman was also commemorated, as folklorists such as Alan Lomax recorded blues there by inmates (most notably Bukka White) on several occasions, dating to the 1930s.

Current markers

Locations are in Mississippi unless otherwise stated.

Source: Mississippi Blues Trail official web site

See also

Delta Blues Museum

References

External links

Mississippi Blues Trail list and map

Delta Blues in the Lower Mississippi Valley, Indianola
Mississippi Blues Highway Registry

 
Mississippi culture
Tourist attractions in Mississippi
Music of Mississippi
2006 establishments in Mississippi
Historically African-American theaters and music venues